The Metropolitan Cathedral Church of Saint Andrew or Glasgow Metropolitan Cathedral is a Roman Catholic Cathedral in the city centre of Glasgow, Scotland. It is the mother church of the Roman Catholic Archdiocese of Glasgow. The cathedral, which was designed in 1814 by James Gillespie Graham in the Neo Gothic style, lies on the north bank of the River Clyde in Clyde Street. St Andrew's Cathedral is the seat of the Archbishop of Glasgow, currently William Nolan. It is dedicated to the patron saint of Scotland, Saint Andrew.

History

From the Scottish Reformation of 1560 until the beginning of the Catholic Emancipation process in 1791, with the Roman Catholic Relief Act of 1791 – which restored certain civil rights and freedom of worship – Roman Catholics in Glasgow had to worship covertly. By the end of the 18th century, particularly with the influx of Irish Catholic immigrants to Glasgow during the nascent stages of the Industrial Revolution, there emerged an increasing demand for a Roman Catholic church in the city. In 1805 there were approximately 450 Catholics in the city, but by 1814 the number of recorded communicants in the city had increased to 3,000, and in that year the decision was taken by the Rev. Andrew Scott to build a new church in Clyde Street.

The lands upon which the church was built had been purchased from the owners of the firm of Bogle and Scott which had previously traded from that site as part of Glasgow's tobacco and sugar trade with America and the West Indies. The families of Bogle and Scott, mostly Presbyterian and Episcopalian, were prominent names in Glasgow who owned numerous estates around the city and often held leading municipal offices, such as George Bogle of Daldowie, Lord Rector of the university.

Completed in 1816, and designed by James Gillespie Graham (1776–1855), the church of St. Andrew formally re-introduced the Roman Catholic presence to Glasgow.

The continuing hostility to the Roman Catholic Church in Scotland was evident during the construction of the church: work completed during the day was torn down by saboteurs at night, delaying completion and eventually guards had to be placed on the building site to protect the construction works. However, congregations of other Christian denominations in the city donated money for the completion of the project in a gesture of ecumenism in light of the difficulties faced in construction. The church building is relatively modest in scale, without a steeple or bell tower. This was due primarily to continuing restrictions on the prominence of Catholic places of worship under the Relief Act of 1791, that were not ultimately repealed until the later Catholic Relief Act of 1829.

In the wake of the Restoration of the Scottish hierarchy, undertaken by Pope Leo XIII in 1878, the church of St Andrew was eventually raised to the status of pro-cathedral in 1884, and was also extensively renovated at that time by the architects Pugin and Pugin.

In 1947, with the establishment of the new Dioceses of Motherwell and Paisley, the Archdiocese of Glasgow recovered the status of metropolitan diocese which it had had before the Reformation and St Andrew's became a metropolitan cathedral.

Organ
The cathedral's pipe organ was originally built in 1903 by Henry Willis & Sons for the former Elgin Place Congregational Church at the corner of Pitt Street and Bath Street, and was reinstalled at St Andrew's Cathedral in 1981, when the church closed for worship.

The specification is as follows:

Pedals

Open Diapason (Mirrlees)       32
Open Diapason                  16
Bourdon                        16
Octave                          8
Flute Bass                      8

Choir

Hohl Flute                      8
Gamba                           8
Dulciana                        8
Flute Harmonique                4
Piccolo                         2
Corno Di Bassetto               8

Great Organ

Double Diapason                16
Open Diapason No.1              8
Open Diapason No.2              8
Clarabel Flute                  8
Principal                       4
Harmonic Flute                  4
Fifteenth                       2
Mixture                      3rks
Trumpet                         8
Clarion                         4

Swell Organ

Lieblich Bourdon               16
Open Diapason                   8
Lieblich Gedact                 8
Salicional                      8
Vox Angelica                    8
Gemshorn                        4
Flageolet                       2
Hautboy                         8
Cornopean                       8
Clarion                         4

Couplers

Swell to Pedal
Choir to Pedal
Great to Pedal
Swell to Choir
Swell Octave to Great
Swell to Great

As part of the cathedral renovation in 2009/2010 the organ was dismantled and placed in storage by David Wells (Organ Builders Ltd) Liverpool. There is currently an Allen Protégé AP-6 electronic organ in use. There is an organ restoration fund to reinstall the Willis.

St Andrew's Parish
St Andrew's Parish traces its origins to the reappointment of a parish priest for Glasgow in 1792. That year, two hundred people came to the opening Mass in a rented hall in Mitchell Street. Five years later, new premises in the Calton area of the East End provided for 600 people each Sunday until the celebration of the first Mass in the new Church of St Andrew at Clyde Street on 22 December 1816.

Since then, the opening of new parishes and the redevelopment of the city centre have depleted the population of the cathedral parish, but the remaining small community of parishioners is augmented by numbers from elsewhere, some of whom travel considerable distances to assist with the celebration of the liturgy and the care of the fabric. Shoppers, workers, students, tourists and passers-by also regularly visit the cathedral – for quiet prayer, for Mass, or for the Sacrament of Reconciliation. There are also major liturgies celebrated frequently by the archbishop, which attract worshippers from parishes throughout the archdiocese.

Renovation
A major restoration project began on 14 August 2009 as the cathedral had long been in need of major refurbishment and expansion. The programme of renovation included the completion of new heating and lighting systems as well as redecoration and gold leaf restoration, installation of newly commissioned bronze doors, the repair and reinstatement of the pipe organ and the installation of a new canvas by Peter Howson depicting the martyrdom of St John Ogilvie. The work was completed in April 2011, and saw the return of the cathedra to St Andrew's Cathedral from the temporary pro-cathedral of the Archdiocese of Glasgow at Saint Mary's, Calton. The cathedral re-opened officially on 11 April 2011.

Clergy 

 Rt. Rev. Mgr. Alexander Munro (1867–1892)
 Rev. James Mackintosh (1893–1900)
 Rev. James McCarthy (1900–1914)
 Rev. George Ritchie (1914–1923)
 Rev. James Mullin (1923–1925)
 Rt. Rev. Mgr. William Canon Daly (1925–1947)
 Very Rev. Joseph Canon Daniel (1947–1965)
 Rev. Denis Meechan (1965–1967)
 Rev. John McGuckin (1967–1980)
 Very Rev. John Canon Brannan (1980–1983)
 Rt. Rev. Mgr. Hugh N. Canon Boyle (1983–?)
 -----------
 Rt. Rev. Mgr. Christopher McElroy (?–2017)
 Very Rev. Gerald Canon Sharkey (2017–2022)
 Very Rev. Andrew Canon McKenzie (2022–present)

See also
 Archbishop of Glasgow
 Catholicism in Scotland
 Glasgow Cathedral, the Church of Scotland Presbyterian High Kirk of Glasgow
 St Mary's Cathedral, Glasgow, the Episcopalian cathedral
 St Luke's Orthodox Cathedral, Glasgow, the Greek Orthodox cathedral
 Listed Building in Scotland

References

External links
 Official Website of the RC Cathedral of Glasgow
 Merchant City - Old Glasgow Sights -  Contains historical extracts, engravings and drawings of the cathedral.
 Friends of Glasgow Necropolis - Michael Scott and James Bogle - notes about Bogle and Scott office and warehouse on site of current Cathedral.

Roman Catholic churches completed in 1816
19th-century Roman Catholic church buildings in the United Kingdom
Saint Andrew
Saint Andrew
Roman Catholic cathedrals in Scotland
Saint Andrew
Listed cathedrals in Scotland
James Gillespie Graham buildings
1816 establishments in Scotland
Listed churches in Glasgow